The NEC Karuizawa 72 is an annual golf tournament on the LPGA of Japan Tour. It is first played in 1987. The event is held in Nagano, currently at the Karuizawa 72 Golf North Course. The prize fund for 2019 was ¥80,000,000 with ¥14,400,000 going to the winner.

Tournament names through the years:
1987–1991 Karuizawa 72 Tokyu Ladies Open
1992–present NEC Karuizawa 72

Winners
2022 Chisato Iwai
2021 Sakura Koiwai
2020 Yuka Saso
2019 Lala Anai
2018 Hwang Ah-reum
2017 Mamiko Higa
2016 Ritsuko Ryu
2015 Teresa Lu
2014 Lee Bo-mee
2013 Misuzu Narita
2012 Yumiko Yoshida
2011 Ahn Sun-ju
2010 Lee Ji-hee
2009 Chie Arimura
2008 Erina Hara
2007 Akiko Fukushima
2006 Shiho Oyama
2005 Paula Creamer
2004 Rui Kitada
2003 Akiko Fukushima
2002 Akiko Fukushima
2001 Chieko Amanuma
2000 Yuri Fudoh
1999 Han Hee-Won
1998 Yuka Irie
1997 Yuka Irie
1996 Akiko Fukushima
1995 Mayumi Hirase
1994 Mayumi Hirase
1993 Mitsuyo Hirata
1992 Mayumi Murai
1991 Ayako Okamoto
1990 Chikayo Yamazaki
1989 Dottie Mochrie
1988 Tammie Green
1987 Tatsuko Ohsako

External links
Official website

LPGA of Japan Tour events
Sport in Nagano Prefecture
Tourist attractions in Nagano Prefecture
Recurring sporting events established in 1987
1987 establishments in Japan
NEC Corporation